This is a list of notable artists who were born in India and or have a strong association with India.

 Abanindranath Tagore (1871-1951)
 Amrita Sher-Gil (1913–1941)
 Jamini Roy (1887–1972)
 Kalipada Ghoshal (1906–1995)
 Maniam (1924–1968)
 Manishi Dey (1909–1966)
 Mukul Chandra Dey (1895–1989)
 Nandalal Bose (1882–1966)
 Rabindranath Tagore (1861–1941)
 Raja Ravi Varma (1848–1906)
 S. G. Thakur Singh (1899–1976)
 Satyajit Ray (1921-1992)
 Silpi (1919–1983)
 Benode Behari Mukherjee (1904–1980)
 Gaganendranath Tagore (1867–1938)
 Sunil Das (1939–2015)

Contemporary artists

 Anish Kapoor (Born 1954)
 Abdul Kadar Khatri (1961 - 2019) Indian Master Craftsman
 Aditya Pande (born 1976), painter, sculptor, digital artist
 Aman Singh Gulati (born 2000),World's First Almond Artist 
 Anil Kumar Dutta (1933-2006)
 Anjolie Ela Menon (born 1940), painter
 Chitra Ramanathan (born 1955), painter
 Atul Dodiya (born 1959), painter
 B. Prabha (1933–2001),  painter
 Badri Narayan (1929-2013), painter
 Baiju Parthan (born 1956), painter
 Balan Nambiar (born 1937), sculptor, painter and research scholar
 Bapu (1933–2014), painter
 Bharti Kher (born 1969), painter, sculptor and installation artist
 Bhavna Mehta (born 1968), paper-cut artist
 Bholekar Srihari (1941-2018), painter, sculptor and printmaker
 Bhupen Khakkar (1934–2003), painter
 Bhuri Bai (1968), Bhil artist
 Bijan Choudhury (1931–2012), painter 
 Bikash Bhattacharjee (1940–2006)
 Daku, pseudonymous graffiti artist
 Devajyoti Ray (born 1974)
 Edmund Thomas Clint (1976-1983) child prodigy who painted over 25,000 paintings during his life of 6 years 11 months
 Dhiraj Choudhury (1936-2018)
 Dhruvi Acharya (born 1971), visual artist
 Dimpy Bhalotia (born 1987), street photographer
 Francis Newton Souza (1924-2002)
 Gargi Raina (born 1961), painter
 Satyendra Pakhale (born 1967)
 Gieve Patel (born 1940) 
 Gogi Saroj Pal (born 1945)
 Gurpreet Singh Dhuri (born 1983)
 Indrani Pal-Chaudhuri (born 1983), photographer, film director
 Jayant Parikh (born 1940)
 Jahar Dasgupta (born 1942), painter
 Jogen Chowdhury (born 1939)
 John Wilkins (1927-1991)
 K.G. Subramanyan (1924–2016)
 Kailash Chandra Meher (born 1954), painter
 Kanu Desai (1907–1980)
 Karuna Sukka (born 1980), printmaker
 Kurchi Dasgupta (born 1974)
 M R D Dattan (1935-2006)
 M.F. Husain (1915–2011)
 Madhan (born 1947)
 Madhuri Bhaduri (born 1958)
 Manav Gupta (born 1967) 
 Manjit Bawa (1941–2008)
 Maya Burman (born 1971)
 Mohammed Yusuf Khatri (born 1967), Bagh printer
 Mohan Samant (1924–2004)
 Mubarack Nissa (born 1981), artist and curator
 Nandita Kumar (born 1981), new media artist
 Neeraj Gupta (born 1969), sculpture artist
 Nek Chand (1924-2015)
 Norman Douglas Hutchinson (1932–2010)
 Ananta Mandal (born 1983), watercolorist
 Paris Mohan Kumar
 Paresh Maity (born 1965), painter and sculptor
 Piraji Sagara (1931-2014)
 Prafulla Dahanukar (1934-2014), painter
 Pranava Prakash (born 1979)
 Rabin Mondal (1929-2019)
 Ram Chandra Shukla (1925-2016)
 Ramkinkar Baij (1906–1980), painter and sculptor
 Ratnadeep Adivrekar (born 1974)
 Ravi Mandlik (born 1960), painter
 Reena Saini Kallat (born 1973)
 S. Jithesh (born 1974)
 S. Rajam (1919-2010)
 S.H. Raza (1922-2016)
 Samir Mondal (born 1952), water colourist
 Satish Gujral (1925-2020)
 Sekar Ayyanthole (born 1954)
 Shashikant Dhotre (born 1982), drawing, painter, installations
 Shilpa Gupta (born 1976)
 Siddharth Katragadda (born 1972)
 Surekha, artist, video and photo installations
 Somalal Shah (1905-1994)
 Srimati Lal (1959-2019), artist and poet
 Y.G. Srimati (1926-2007), painter
 Suvigya Sharma (born 1983)
 Thukral & Tagra (born 1976, born 1979)
 Vasudeo S. Gaitonde (1924–2001), painter
 Vivan Sundaram (born 1943), installation artist
 Yantr
 Sudarsan Pattnaik (born 1977) Sand Artist
 Saba Hasan (born 1962) contemporary artist
 K.R.Sunil (Born 1975)
 Tom Vattakuzhy (Born 1967)
 Sajitha R. Shankar (Born 1967)
 Rajan Krishnan (1968-2016)

References

Lists of Indian artists